Carine is an electoral district of the Legislative Assembly in the Australian state of Western Australia.

The district is based in Perth's northern suburbs. Politically, it has been a safe Liberal seat but Paul Lilburne won it for the Labor Party for the first time at the 2021 election.

Geography
Carine is a beachside electorate located in Perth's northern suburbs. It is bounded to the east by the Mitchell Freeway, to the south by North Beach Road, Karrinyup Road and Reid Highway and to the west by the Indian Ocean. Its northern boundary consists of Hepburn Avenue. The districts includes the suburbs of Carine, Watermans Bay, Sorrento, Duncraig, Marmion and Karrinyup.

History
Carine was first created for the 1996 state election. It largely replaced the abolished district of Marmion.

The district boundaries were redistributed in 2019 and saw the suburbs of North Beach and Gwelup being removed while the suburb of Sorrento was added.

Members for Carine

Election results

References

External links
 ABC election profiles: 2005 2008
 WAEC district maps: current boundaries, previous distributions

Carine